Myzomela is a genus of bird in the honeyeater family Meliphagidae. It is the largest genus of honeyeaters, with 39 species, and the most geographically widespread. It ranges from Indonesia to Australia and into the islands of the Pacific Ocean as far as Micronesia and Samoa.

The genus was introduced by the naturalists Nicholas Vigors and Thomas Horsfield in 1827. The type species is the scarlet myzomela (Myzomela sanguinolenta).

The genus contains the following 40 species:

 Drab myzomela (Myzomela blasii)
 White-chinned myzomela (Myzomela albigula)
 Ashy myzomela (Myzomela cineracea)
 Ruby-throated myzomela (Myzomela eques)
Moluccan myzomela (Myzomela simplex)
Red-tinged myzomela (Myzomela rubrotincta)
Biak myzomela (Myzomela rubrobrunnea)
 Dusky myzomela (Myzomela obscura)
 Red myzomela (Myzomela cruentata)
Reddish myzomela (Myzomela erythrina)
 Papuan black myzomela (Myzomela nigrita)
 New Ireland myzomela (Myzomela pulchella)
 Wetar myzomela (Myzomela kuehni)
 Alor myzomela (Myzomela prawiradilagae)
 Red-headed myzomela (Myzomela erythrocephala)
 Sumba myzomela (Myzomela dammermani)
 Rote myzomela (Myzomela irianawidodoae)
 Mountain myzomela (Myzomela adolphinae)
 Banda myzomela (Myzomela boiei)
 Taliabu myzomela (Myzomela wahe)
 Sulawesi myzomela (Myzomela chloroptera)
 Bacan myzomela (Myzomela batjanensis)
 Wakolo myzomela (Myzomela wakoloensis)
 Scarlet myzomela (Myzomela sanguinolenta)
 New Caledonian myzomela (Myzomela caledonica)
 Cardinal myzomela (Myzomela cardinalis)
 Rotuma myzomela (Myzomela chermesina)
 Micronesian myzomela (Myzomela rubratra)
 Sclater's myzomela (Myzomela sclateri)
 Bismarck black myzomela (Myzomela pammelaena)
 Red-capped myzomela (Myzomela lafargei)
 Crimson-rumped myzomela (Myzomela eichhorni)
 Red-vested myzomela (Myzomela malaitae)
 Black-headed myzomela (Myzomela melanocephala)
 Sooty myzomela (Myzomela tristrami)
 Sulphur-breasted myzomela (Myzomela jugularis)
 Black-bellied myzomela (Myzomela erythromelas)
 Black-breasted myzomela (Myzomela vulnerata)
 Red-collared myzomela (Myzomela rosenbergii)
Long-billed myzomela (Myzomela longirostris)

References

 
Bird genera
Taxa named by Thomas Horsfield
Taxa named by Nicholas Aylward Vigors
Taxonomy articles created by Polbot